Howard Symmes Russell (1887–1980) was an American author, gardener, and politician.

Howard Symmes Russell was born on July 28, 1887. His parents were Ira Locke Russell and Louisa Symmes Locke. The younger Russell ended his pursuit of higher education following graduation from Arlington High School to manage the family market garden when his father retired. Russell married Mabel Coolidge in 1913, and moved to Wayland after selling the land he owned in Arlington. Russell became a farm fire insurance broker. His public service career included a stint as trustee of the Massachusetts Agricultural College, tenure as Wayland town moderator between 1939 to 1959, and several terms in the Massachusetts House of Representatives from 1949 to 1954. He represented the 10th Middlesex district as a Republican.

Russell wrote A Long, Deep Furrow in 1976, followed by the posthumous publication of Indian New England before the Mayflower in 1980. He died on April 8, 1980. His wife Mabel Russell died on August 30, 1983.

See also
 1949–1950 Massachusetts legislature
 1951–1952 Massachusetts legislature
 1953–1954 Massachusetts legislature

References 

1887 births
1980 deaths
20th-century American male writers
People from Arlington, Massachusetts
Republican Party members of the Massachusetts House of Representatives
20th-century American politicians
Historians of New England
University of Massachusetts Amherst people
Historians from Massachusetts
People from Wayland, Massachusetts
American agricultural writers
Massachusetts city council members
20th-century American historians
American male non-fiction writers
American gardeners
Businesspeople from Massachusetts
20th-century American businesspeople